Today Is Vintage is an entertainment company founded in 2012 in Malmo, Sweden by music mogul Rebstar. As of 2022, the company represents Grammy winners and artists, songwriters and producers accumulating over 10 billion streams worldwide. Spearheading the "Swedish invasion", Today Is Vintage is one of country's leading record labels, music publishers and management firms  with its headquarters in New York City.

History
Today Is Vintage was founded by Swedish artist Rebstar in 2012 to serve as a platform for creative minds with international potential.

In late 2012, American-Hungarian Kállay Saunders became the first artist to sign to the label with his first single My Baby peaking #1 on the Hungarian Top 40 chart.

In 2019, Today Is Vintage moved its headquarters to New York City.

In 2020, the company launched its film and TV production division with Saturday Night Live writer Megan Callahan-Shah serving as co-founder and co-CEO.

Roster

Amadeus
DJ Pain 1
Evince
fransisco!
GERD
Gingr
Isac Cederborg
 LE SINNER
 MoonFace
Naod
New West
 Rebstar
 Riley Bell
SYNCHRO
T-Minus
Virgin Miri
WIZARDMCE

References

External links
 www.todayisvintage.com

Swedish record labels
Event management companies of Sweden
Today Is Vintage
Today Is Vintage
Publishing companies established in 2012
Record labels established in 2012
Hip hop record labels
Pop record labels